Lalla Rookh  is an Oriental romance by Irish poet Thomas Moore, published in 1817. The title is taken from the name of the heroine of the frame tale, the (fictional) daughter of the 17th-century Mughal emperor Aurangzeb. The work consists of four narrative poems with the connecting tale in prose.

The name Lalla Rookh or Lala-Rukh ( laleh rox/rukh) is an endearment frequently used in Persian poetry.

Name and background
The name Lalla Rookh or Lala-Rukh ( laleh rox or rukh), means "tulip-cheeked" and is an endearment frequently used in Persian poetry. Lalla Rookh has also been translated as "rosy-cheeked"; however, the first word derives from the Persian word for tulip, laleh, and a different word, laal, means rosy, or ruby. Tulips were first cultivated in Persia, probably in the 10th century, and remain a powerful symbol in Iranian culture, and the name Laleh is a popular girl's name. Rukh also translates as "face".

Lalla Rookh is a fictional daughter of Emperor Aurangzeb; he had no daughter of this name.

Moore set his poem in a sumptuous oriental setting on the advice of Lord Byron.
The work was completed in 1817 while Moore was living in a house in the countryside of Hornsey, Middlesex, and the house was renamed, possibly by Moore himself, after the poem.

Overview
Engaged to the young king of Bukhara, Lalla Rookh goes forth to meet him, but falls in love with Feramorz, a poet from her entourage. The bulk of the work consists of four interpolated tales sung by the poet: "The Veiled Prophet of Khorassan" (loosely based upon the story of Al-Muqanna), "Paradise and the Peri", "The Fire-Worshippers", and "The Light of the Harem". When Lalla Rookh enters the palace of her bridegroom she swoons away, but revives at the sound of a familiar voice. She awakes with rapture to find that the poet she loves is none other than the king to whom she is engaged.

Allegorical meaning

Scholars have stated Moore, a friend of the executed Irish rebel Robert Emmet, depicts in the poem "disguised versions of the French Revolution and the Irish Rebellion of 1798, [and] condemns the former but justifies the latter".

Adaptations

Lalla Rookh was the basis of number of musical settings, including a cantata by Frederic Clay & W. G. Wills (1877) featuring the famous song I'll Sing Thee Songs of Araby.<ref>Michael Kilgariff (1998) Sing Us One of the Old Songs: A Guide to Popular Song 1860–1920</ref>The Fire-Worshippers is an 1892 "dramatic cantata" by Granville Bantock based on one of the tales.

It is also the basis of the operas Lalla-Rûkh, festival pageant (1821) by Gaspare Spontini, partly reworked into Nurmahal oder das Rosenfest von Caschmir (1822), Lalla-Roukh by Félicien David (1862), Feramors by Anton Rubinstein (1863), and The Veiled Prophet by Charles Villiers Stanford (1879).  One of the interpolated tales, Paradise and the Peri, was set as a choral-orchestral work by Robert Schumann (1843). Lines from the poem form the lyrics of the song "Bendemeer Stream".

The poem was translated into German in 1846, as Laleh-Rukh. Eine romantische Dichtung aus dem Morgenlande, by  Anton Edmund Wollheim Da Fonseca, and was possibly the most translated poem of its time.Lala Rookh, a 1958 Indian Hindi-language romantic-drama film by Akhtar Siraj was based on Moore's poem.

 Legacy 
The poem, which earned the highest price ever thus far for a poem (£3,000), enhanced Moore's reputation considerably at the time.

The popularity of the poem and its subsequent adaptations gave rise to many ships being named Lalla Rookh during the 19th century.

Alfred Joseph Woolmer painted "Lalla Rookh" in 1861, depicting  Hinda, daughter of the Emir of Arabia, in a tower overlooking the Persian Gulf, based on the story called "The Fire-Worshippers" in the poem. It is now housed in the Leicester Museum & Art Gallery.

It is also credited with having made Kashmir (spelt Cashmere in the poem) "a household term in Anglophone societies", conveying the idea that it was a kind of paradise (an old idea going back to Hindu and Buddhist texts in Sanskrit.

Mystic Order of Veiled Prophets of the Enchanted Realm (founded 1889), often known as "the Grotto", a social group with membership restricted to Master Masons, and its female auxiliary, the Daughters of Mokanna (founded 1919), also take their names from Thomas Moore's poem.

A tomb in Hassanabdal, Pakistan, dating from the Mughal Empire, is known as tomb of Princess Lalarukh. Some historians and others say that there is a woman called Lalarukh from the household of Emperor Humayun buried here after dying on a journey from Kashmir, while others claim that she was the daughter of Emperor Aurangzeb. The tomb was first recorded as the Tomb of Lady Lalarukh in 1905, which historians suggest was derived from Moore's popular work and named by British officers in the time of British India.

In George Eliot's 1871/1872 novel Middlemarch, it is said of the character Rosamond Vincy, "Her favorite poem was 'Lalla Rookh'" (Chapter 16).

 References 

External links

  – Summarises the four narratives.
 Text of "Paradise and the Peri"
 Lalla Rookh prepared for the web by Fran Pritchett
 
 The Complete Poems of Sir Thomas Moore, including Lalla Rookh''

Poetry by Thomas Moore
Mughal Empire in fiction
Irish poems
Narrative poems
1817 poems
India in fiction
Poems adapted into films